The New York Riptide are a lacrosse team based in Uniondale, New York playing in the National Lacrosse League (NLL). The 2022 season is the team's 2nd season in the league.

Regular season

Current standings

Game log

Roster

Entry Draft
The 2021 NLL Entry Draft took place on August 28, 2021. The Riptide made the following selections:

References

New York Riptide
New York Riptide
New York Riptide